Ashlee Ageron Jones (born 4 August 1987) is an English footballer who plays as a goalkeeper for Potters Bar Town. Jones came through the ranks at Southampton where he was a member of the squad that reached the FA Youth Cup Final in 2005. He later played in the Football League for Darlington, and includes Rushden & Diamonds, Wycombe Wanderers, Braintree Town and Lowestoft Town among his former clubs.

Career
Jones was born in Walthamstow, London. He played for Rushden & Diamonds, Potters Bar Town, Fisher Athletic and Crawley Town before signing for Wycombe Wanderers in March 2009 on a non-contract basis.

In October 2009, Jones joined League Two club Darlington. He made his Football League debut on 1 December 2009 for Darlington in their 4–0 away defeat against Notts County. His contract was cancelled by mutual consent on 16 February 2010.

Jones signed for Isthmian League Premier Division club Canvey Island on 17 August 2012, and joined Lowestoft Town the following season on a one-year contract.

Following a spell with East Thurrock United, Jones returned to Braintree Town prior to the 2018–19 campaign. After three league appearances, and a couple of matches on loan at Coggeshall Town, Jones made the switch to Southern League club Bedford Town and made his debut in their FA Trophy defeat to Chesterfield. He helped them reach the play-offs, in which they lost to Corby Town, and rejoined Coggeshall Town at the end of the season. He played regularly for Coggeshall before signing for another Isthmian League North club, Heybridge Swifts, in March 2020, shortly before the leagues were abandoned because of the COVID-19 pandemic.

Jones signed for Essex Senior League club Hashtag United on a 1 game loan and played his first and last game in the FA Cup against Soham Town Rangers on 21 September 2020. He subsequently signed for Romford, before returning to Hashtag United on loan for a league match away to Walthamstow.

In August 2021, Jones joined Waltham Abbey. He made his debut in a loss to Bedford Town on 14 August 2021.

In January 2022, Jones signed for Harlow Town for a second time, after he had a previous short-term spell with the Hawks in October 2017. He played his first game since re-signing in a 3-0 win against Colney Heath on 25 January 2022. In February 2023, he signed for Potters Bar Town following a spell with Welwyn Garden City.

References

External links
Ashlee Jones Leiston FC record
Ashlee Jones Waltham Abbey record
Ashlee Jones Harlow Town record

1987 births
Living people
Footballers from Walthamstow
English footballers
Association football goalkeepers
Rushden & Diamonds F.C. players
Basingstoke Town F.C. players
Harrow Borough F.C. players
Potters Bar Town F.C. players
Crawley Town F.C. players
Fisher Athletic F.C. players
Kingstonian F.C. players
Wycombe Wanderers F.C. players
Darlington F.C. players
Billericay Town F.C. players
Boreham Wood F.C. players
Braintree Town F.C. players
Wealdstone F.C. players
Canvey Island F.C. players
Lowestoft Town F.C. players
Leiston F.C. players
Staines Town F.C. players
Harlow Town F.C. players
East Thurrock United F.C. players
Coggeshall Town F.C. players
Bedford Town F.C. players
Heybridge Swifts F.C. players
Hashtag United F.C. players
Romford F.C. players
Waltham Abbey F.C. players
Welwyn Garden City F.C. players
National League (English football) players
Isthmian League players
English Football League players
Southern Football League players